Toshka Lakes is the name given to recently formed endorheic lakes in the Sahara Desert of Egypt. A connection called weirs, waterfalls, or the Toshka overflow, which, accordingly, led to the formation of what is known as Toshka lakes due to the receding of the surplus of the Nile water in the depression.

The presence of the depression helped establish the Toshka New Valley Project. Which mainly consists of the Sheikh Zayed Canal, which starts from the Mubarak pump station to raise water from the creek of Lake Nasser to the canal, with the aim of reclaiming thousands of acres and developing the southern valley area.

Etymology 
Opinions differed about naming the region as “Toshka” between two opinions:

 The first opinion: that the word “toshka” is made up of two syllables, the first syllable is “toshi” or “tosho”, which is the name of a type of medicinal herb that grows in the valley of Toshka, which is the stump plant (in English: Ambrosia), while the second syllable is “ki” or “Ke” or “Ka” and its meaning in the Nubian dialect is "the place", "the house", or "the homeland", and therefore the meaning of the word “toshka” in its entirety is “the home of the Ghubeira plant.”
 The second opinion is the prevailing opinion; That the lakes are named after a Nubian village Toshka (Old Nubian: ⲧⲱϣⲕⲉⲁ) who lived in the region in the past, until which the village was drowned after the construction of the Aswan High Dam. The word “toshka” consists of two syllables.

In the past, the Toshka region included two villages, one east of the Nile, “Toshka East” and the other west of the Nile, “Toshka West.” The residents used Nile boats to move between the two villages. The two new ones have the same name “Toshka East” and “Toshka West”. A new city was built in remembrance of the village.

History

Battle of Toski 

In the year 1889, a famous battle took place on the land of the Toshka region between the English campaign and the army of the Mahdist State. Madhist revolutionaries  marched from Sudan under the leadership of Abd al-Rahman al-Nujumi, claiming to rid the Nile Valley of the corruption of the Turkish and English rulers, spread the Madhist faith to Egypt, and to free Ahmed Orabi from prison.

Aswan High Dam 

As a precaution against any unexpected rise in Lake Nasser's water level, a spillway and channel were built in 1978. The channel has the potential to divert water from the reservoir to the Toshka basin, which is located outside the Nile basin. This design relieves dam pressure and protects downstream areas from massive flooding. The canal was made through a spillway channel that was dug starting from Khor Toshka branching from Lake Nasser and passing through the Toshka Valley in the Western Desert until it connects to the depression at a point.

Formation 
In 1998, Ethiopia experienced mass flash floods and river floods. Excess water coming from in Ethiopia's highlands put strain on the river Nile and put the flood control plan of the Aswan High Dam to the test. For the first time, the massive reservoir reached its highest level of 183 meters above sea level in September. Excess water started being released from Lake Nasser by overflow into a hollow at the south end of the Eocene limestone plateau. During September and October, the basin received between 32 and 98 million cubic meters of water per day.

Astronauts on the ISS began noticing the first, easternmost lake growing in November 1998. By late 1999, three additional lakes formed successively westward, and the westernmost lake started forming sometime between September 2000 and March 2001. These lakes are not yet named individually. 

It was estimated that in total, the Toshka Lakes cover approximately 1300 square kilometers (502 mi2). The levels of the lakes  are lower than in 2001, and areas of wetlands and sand dunes have formed between the former and present shorelines. A minor lake downstream of the three larger lakes has completely dried out.

Decline 

By the late 2000s, the Toshka region experienced an increase in agricultural activity, with farmers using water from Lake Toshka and pumps from Lake Nasser for agricultural purposes. The region saw some economic growth as a result of the increased agricultural activity. As a new city was built to support the Toshka Agricultural Project located northeast of Sheikh Zayed Canal. The city of New Toshka was established by Presidential Decree No. 199 of 2000 and its location modified by Presidential Decree No. 268 of 2006 with the aim of creating an integrated urban community.

By 2006, Lake Toshka's water levels began to decline rapidly, exposing large areas of dry land. The amount of stored water had been reduced by 50%.

By June 2012, water filled only the lowest parts of the main western and eastern basins, covering a surface area of 307 square kilometers, or roughly 80% less than in 2002. The central basin is almost completely devoid of water and the rest of the lakes had mostly dried up due to low flow in the river.

In 2017, The lakes shrank even more in subsequent years, nearly completely dry, leaving only small remnants of water in the western basins.

Sudan Floods 
The 2019 summer rainfall in Sudan and South Sudan was significant enough to raise the water level in Lake Nasser, which allowed the eastern Toshka basin to start refilling. This event was followed by the record-breaking floods that occurred in Sudan in 2020. These floods led to the highest water level ever recorded in Lake Nasser. The following year, in 2021, another flood occurred in Sudan. Then, due to the 2022 Sudanese floods, Lake Nasser approached record levels once again, causing the Toshka Lakes to fill rapidly.

The filling of the Toshka Lakes in 2022 resulted in the highest water levels ever recorded in the area, and it also indicated the formation of new lakes in depressions located to the north and south of the eastern basin. The area covered by the original lakes even increased substantially above the levels seen in 2001, gaining 3 more lakes on the eastern side. This increase in water levels has had a significant impact on the agricultural areas in the region, which have grown considerably due to the abundance of water. As a result, the Toshka agriculture project has benefited greatly from the increased water supply, and the region's economy has received a boost, with the area of agriculture expanded.

Geography
 The new lake system is endorheic, that is, the waters can never flow on to the sea. The Nile-sourced water creates the lakes and helps to recharge the underlying aquifer; but desert temperatures cause very high levels of evaporation. Although the new lakes already contain an impressive amount of fish, these high evaporation levels will make the waters become increasingly saline over time, reducing fish stocks and harming the newly established flora and fauna.
 The Toshka Hollow lies within the seismically active Nubian Swell. The Egyptian government is developing the surrounding region, also known as the "New Valley Project". The plan is to extend the waterway to the Kharga oasis.
 Use of Nile resources is governed by the Nile Basin Initiative; but the Toshka project does not breach the agreement as water is diverted from Lake Nasser only after heavy water flows upstream have raised lake levels above  (see above).

See also
New Valley Project
New Valley Governorate
Lakes of Egypt

References

Further reading

External links

Jan. 2003 MODIS false color image of the Toshka Lakes.*

Endorheic lakes of Africa
Lakes of Egypt
Lake Nasser
New Valley Governorate

cs:Toška